Fred Cogswell CM (November 8, 1917 – June 20, 2004) was a Canadian poet.

Life and career
Born in East Centreville, New Brunswick he served overseas in the Canadian Army during the Second World War. A teacher at the age of sixteen, Cogswell gained a BA(Hons) and MA at the University of New Brunswick and received a PhD from Edinburgh University. He later became a professor of English at the University of New Brunswick, a position he held from 1952 to 1983.

In 1958, Cogswell, along with friend and fellow poet Warren Kinthompson as well as a group of students and faculty from the University of New Brunswick founded Fiddlehead Poetry Books, now one of Canada's important small press publishers operating as Goose Lane Editions.

Fred Cogswell was made a member of the Order of Canada in 1981.

Fred Cogswell was a prolific poet, translator, editor and scholar and was dubbed "A Friend of Poets - Amis des Poètes" for his lifelong commitment to poetry and those who write it. He was the author of 33 books of his own poetry, 9 books of poetry translation and publisher of 307 books of poetry. In addition, Fred Cogswell wrote and published many learned articles and reviews.  His poetry has been published in magazines, journals, anthologies and textbooks and has been translated into several languages including Chinese, Romanian, Spanish, and French.

Dr. Cogswell was a Life Member of the League of Canadian Poets, the Association of Canadian Publishers, and the Writers' Federation of New Brunswick.

The Fred Cogswell Award For Excellence In Poetry was founded in 2014 and is an annual event open to Canadian poets.

Selected bibliography
The Stunted Strong, 1954, Fiddlehead Poetry Books (republished 2004 by Goose Lane Editions)
The House Without a Door, 1959, Ryerson Press
Lost Dimension, 1960, Outposts Publications, Dulwich Village, UK
Immortal Plowman, 1969, Fiddlehead Poetry Books 
One Hundred Poems of Modern Quebec, 1970, Fiddlehead Poetry Books (ed. & trans.)
The House Without a Door, 1973, Fiddlehead Poetry Books 
The Best Notes Merge, 1988, Borealis Press, 
Black and White Tapestry, 1989, Borealis Press, 
Watching An Eagle, 1991, Borealis Press, 
In Praise of Old Music, 1992, Borealis Press, 
When the Right Light Shines, 1992, Borealis Press,  
In My Own Growing, 1993, Borealis Press, 
As I See It, 1994, Borealis Press,  
The Trouble With Light, 1996, Borealis Press, 
Folds, 1997, Borealis Press, 
A Double Question, 1999, Borealis Press, 
With Vision Added, 2000, Borealis Press, 
The Vision of Fred: Conversations with Fred Cogswell on the Nature and Function of Poetry (Kathleen Forsythe, ed.), 2004, Borealis Press,

Anthologies
Coastlines: The Poetry of Atlantic Canada, ed. Anne Compton, Laurence Hutchman, Ross Leckie and Robin McGrath (Goose Lane Editions, 2002)

Awards
Bliss Carman Award for Poetry, 1945, 1947.
Gold Medal, Philippines Republic, for Distinguished Poet, Magazine Editor, 1957.
Member of the Order of Canada, 1981.
L.L.D., St. Francis Xavier University, 1983.
D.C.L., King's College, 1985.
L.L.D., Mount Allison University, 1988.
Alden Nowlan Award for Excellence in Literary Arts, New Brunswick Government, 1995.
Medal for 125th Anniversary of Canada, 1997.

See also

Canadian literature
Canadian poetry
List of Canadian poets
List of Canadian writers

References

 Williamson, Margie. Four Maritime Poets: a survey of the works of Alden Nowlan, Fred Cogswell, Raymond Fraser and Al Pittman, as they reflect the spirit and culture of the Maritime people. Thesis (M.A.), Dalhousie University, 1973 [microform].

External links
Fred Cogswell's entry in The Canadian Encyclopedia
Etching     by Fred Cogswell
Biography of Cogswell with The Leaf
Another Biography
The Sestinas of Fred Cogswell
Fred Cogswell: The Many-Dimensional Self
Fred Cogswell brief bio and sample poems

Canadian military personnel from New Brunswick
Canadian Army personnel
Canadian Army personnel of World War II
20th-century Canadian poets
20th-century Canadian male writers
Canadian male poets
21st-century Canadian poets
1917 births
2004 deaths
Members of the Order of Canada
People from Carleton County, New Brunswick
Members of the Order of New Brunswick
Writers from New Brunswick
Alumni of the University of Edinburgh
21st-century Canadian male writers
Canadian expatriates in Scotland